Vagabond is the tenth album by Eddi Reader released in the UK on 3 February 2014.

Track listing

"I'll Never Be The Same"  - 3:14
"Back The Dogs (Dancing Down Rock)"  - 3:25
"Vagabond"  - 4:08
"Married To The Sea" 5:13
"Edinah" - 2:44
"Snowflakes In The Sun" - 3:32
"Baby's Boat" 3:19
"Macushla (My Darling)" - 4:03
"Midnight In Paris 1979" - 3:31
"Buain Ná Rainich (Fairy Love Song)" 4:25
"In Ma Ain Country" - 3:24
"Pray The Devil Back To Hell" - 4:37
"Here Comes The Bells" - 4:00
"It's A Beautiful Night" - 3:16

Personnel
Eddi Reader - vocals, guitar, piano, concertina, glockenspiel
Angus Aird - guitar
Boo Hewerdine - guitar, backing vocals, piano
Donald Shaw - field harmonium
Ewan Vernal - double bass, piano, backing vocals
Gustaf Ljunggren - electric guitar, 12-string mandolin, lap steel, pedal steel, elbow lap steel, clarinet, banjo, C soprano saxophone, archtop guitar, steel guitar
Ian Carr - guitar, electric guitar
John Douglas - guitar, backing vocals, ukulele, clarsach, piano
John McCusker - fiddle, whistle
Karen Matheson - backing vocals
Madge Nammock - story
Michael McGoldrick - low whistle, pipes
Phil Cunningham - accordion, piano
Roy Dodds - drums
Ryan Quigley - trumpets
Steve Hamilton - piano, overdub piano, vibraphone
Recorded and mixed by Mark Freegard

2014 albums